Ngozi Jane Anyanwu is a playwright and actress.

Life and education 
Anyanwu was born in Nigeria. She earned her BA from Point Park University and her MFA in Acting from University of California San Diego.

She is an alumnus of an Old Vic New Voices program, and has had residencies at Djerassi Artists Residency, Lincoln Center Theater (LCT), and SPACE on Ryder Farm.

She resides in New York.

Work 
Anyanwu's play Good Grief won Center Theatre Group's Humanitas Award after its world premiere at the Kirk Douglas Theatre in 2016. It was included on The Kilroys' List in 2016.

Her play The Homecoming Queen premiered at the Atlantic Theater Company January 22, 2018. It tells the story of a "prodigal daughter" born in Nigeria who returns after living in the USA. The play ran at the Atlantic Theater Company through February 18, 2018.  Her play The Last of the Love Letters, which focuses on two people examining the end of a relationship, premiered at the Atlantic Theater Company on August 26, 2021.

Anyanwu is a recipient of New York Stage and Film's Founders Award. She is commissioned by Old Globe Theatre and the Atlantic Theater Company.

Themes in Anyanwu's work include family, identities, and the concept of home.

Filmography

Television 
Anyanwu is credited as an actress in the following television series:
 The Affair
 Deadbeat
 The Deuce
 Law & Order: Special Victims Unit
 Limitless
 The Mysteries of Laura

References

External links 
 
 

Nigerian dramatists and playwrights
Nigerian television actresses
1980s births
Living people